Kenji Tanaka De Paula (born 15 September 2001) is a Brazilian footballer who plays as a forward for Portuguesa Carioca of Campeonato Brasileiro Série D.

Career 
In 2017, Tanaka moved with his family to the United States in order to try out for Orlando City. He was accepted in to the academy, playing 31 games and scoring 11 goals across multiple age groups in two seasons with the team.

In March 2020, Tanaka signed an academy contract with Orlando City B, Orlando City's USL League One affiliate, ahead of the 2020 season. He made his debut on 7 August 2020, appearing as a 78th-minute substitute and scoring during a 2–0 win over New England Revolution II. In total he made 12 appearances, scoring two goals, before being released as Orlando City B withdrew from USL League One and went on hiatus.

In January 2022, Tanaka signed a six-month contract with Portuguesa Carioca of Série D.

References

External links 
 Kenji Tanaka De Paula at Orlando City SC

2001 births
Living people
Sportspeople from Belém
Brazilian footballers
Association football forwards
Orlando City B players
Associação Atlética Portuguesa (RJ) players
USL League One players
Brazilian people of Japanese descent
Brazilian expatriate footballers
Brazilian expatriate sportspeople in the United States
Expatriate soccer players in the United States